Kariyevo (Qarıy) is a rural locality (a selo) and the administrative centre of Kariyevsky Selsoviet, Krasnokamsky District, Bashkortostan, Russia. The population was 505 as of 2010. There are 7 streets.

Geography 
Kariyevo is located 22 km southeast of Nikolo-Beryozovka (the district's administrative centre) by road. Kangulovo is the nearest rural locality.

References 

Rural localities in Krasnokamsky District